Sodium monofluorophosphate, commonly abbreviated SMFP, is an inorganic compound with the chemical formula Na2PO3F. Typical for a salt, MFP is odourless, colourless, and water-soluble. This salt is an ingredient in some  toothpastes.

Uses
MFP is best known as an ingredient in some toothpastes.  It functions as a source of fluoride via the following hydrolysis reaction:
PO3F2−  +  OH−   →   HPO42−  +  F−

Fluoride protects tooth enamel from attack by bacteria that cause dental caries (cavities). Although developed by a chemist at Procter and Gamble, its use in toothpaste (Colgate toothpaste and Ultra Brite) was patented by Colgate-Palmolive, as Procter and Gamble was engaged in the marketing of Crest toothpaste (containing stannous fluoride, marketed as "Fluoristan"). In the early 1980s, Crest was reformulated to use MFP, under the trademark "Fluoristat"; today Crest toothpastes use sodium fluoride or stannous fluoride. Compared to straight fluorides, sodium monofluorophosphate has slightly less aftertaste.

MFP is also used in some medications for the treatment of osteoporosis.

In 1991, sodium monofluorophosphate was found by Calgon to inhibit the dissolution of lead in drinking water when used in concentrations between 0.1 mg/L and 500 mg/L.

Tooth decay
Tooth decay is caused by bacteria naturally present in one's mouth. These bacteria form a sticky, colorless soft film on the teeth called plaque. When foods containing carbohydrates (starches and sugars) are eaten, the bacteria that form plaque use the sugar as a form of energy. They also turn it into a glue-like substance that helps them stick to the surface of the tooth. The plaque produces acid, which attacks the enamel.

Chemistry of decay
Tooth enamel consists mostly of calcium hydroxyphosphate, Ca5(PO4)3OH, also known as the mineral hydroxyapatite. Apatite is a hard, insoluble compound. Acid (H+), produced especially after a high-sugar meal, attacks the apatite: 
Ca5(PO4)3OH(s) + H+(aq)  →  Ca5(PO4)3+(aq) + H2O(ℓ)

Chemistry of enamel fluoridation
The degradation of apatite by loss of OH− causes the enamel to dissolve.  The process is reversible as saliva supplies back OH−  to reform apatite. If fluoride, F−, ions are present in saliva, fluorapatite, Ca5(PO4)3F, also forms.
Ca5(PO4)3+(aq) + F−(aq)  →  Ca5(PO4)3F(s)

Fluorapatite resists attacks by acids better than apatite itself, so the tooth enamel resists decay better than enamel containing no fluoride.

Preparation and structure
Sodium monofluorophosphate is produced industrially by the reaction of sodium fluoride with sodium metaphosphate:
NaPO3  +  NaF    →   Na2PO3F
The process involves scission of a pyrophosphate bond, analogous to hydrolysis.  NaMFP can also be prepared by treating tetrasodium pyrophosphate or disodium phosphate with hydrogen fluoride.

In the laboratory, MFP can be prepared by hydrolysis of difluorophosphate ions with dilute sodium hydroxide:
PO2F2− + 2 NaOH  →  Na2PO3F + H2O + F−

Structure 
The structure of the fluorophosphate anion consists of phosphorus at the center of a tetrahedron defined by three oxygen atoms and one fluorine. Formal representations depict a double bond between one oxygen atom and phosphorus, with single bonds for the other two oxygen atoms and the fluorine. In this very formal depiction, negative charge is localized on the O atoms of the single P-O bonds. MFP is similar to and isoelectronic with Na2SO4.  The anion has C3v symmetry.

Discovery and development
Sodium monofluorophosphate was first described in 1929 by the German chemist Willy Lange, who was then with the University of Berlin. His fruitless attempts to prepare the free monofluorophosphoric acid led him to check the stability of its esters. Together with Gerda von Krüger, one of his students, Lange thus synthesized diethyl fluorophosphate and some analogs, which proved to be quite toxic, being related to nerve agents. In the 1930s, Gerhard Schrader, working for the German company IG Farben, tried to develop synthetic insecticide. His work focused on esters of phosphoric acid and resulted in an accidental discovery of some other nerve agents such as DFP (diisopropyl fluorophosphate), Tabun, Soman, and Sarin. In the meantime, Lange, who was married to a Jewish woman, emigrated from Germany to the United States and started work for Procter and Gamble Company.  In 1947, he and Ralph Livingston of Monsanto Company published the preparation of the free fluorophosphoric acids and mentioned the use of some toxic esters of monofluorophosphoric acid (like DFP) in the treatment of glaucoma and myasthenia gravis. The well known toxicity of these esters led to fears that the simple salts might also be toxic, and such fears precluded any large scale commercial use of the salts. In 1950, under sponsorship of the manufacturer of the compounds, Ozark Chemical Company, the toxicity of sodium monofluorophosphate was studied by Harold Hodge at the University of Rochester who included anti-cavity testing. In 1967 Colgate-Palmolive filed several patents on the use of sodium monofluorophosphate in toothpaste.

Safety
The usual content of MFP in toothpaste is 0.76%.  The compound is used in place of sodium fluoride, particularly in children's toothpastes, because it is less acutely toxic, although both have modest toxicities.  The  in rats is 0.9 g/kg.

References

Phosphates
Fluoro complexes
Sodium compounds